Fink is a small town Grayson County, Texas.

References

Grayson County, Texas
Towns in Grayson County, Texas